Zootopia (titled Zootropolis or Zoomania in various regions) is a 2016 American computer-animated buddy cop action comedy film produced by Walt Disney Animation Studios and released by Walt Disney Pictures. The 55th Disney animated feature film, the first installment in the Zootopia franchise, it was directed by Byron Howard and Rich Moore, co-directed by Jared Bush (in his feature directorial debut), and produced by Clark Spencer, from a screenplay written by Bush and Phil Johnston, and a story by Howard, Moore, Bush, Johnston, Jim Reardon, Josie Trinidad, and Jennifer Lee. The film stars the voices of Ginnifer Goodwin, Jason Bateman, Idris Elba, Jenny Slate, Nate Torrence, Bonnie Hunt, Don Lake, Tommy Chong, J. K. Simmons, Octavia Spencer, Alan Tudyk, and Shakira. Taking place in the titular city where anthropomorphic mammals coexist, it tells a story of an unlikely partnership between a rabbit police officer and a red fox con artist as they uncover a criminal conspiracy involving the disappearance of predators.

Zootopia premiered at the Brussels Animation Film Festival in Belgium on February 13, 2016, and went into general theatrical release in Disney Digital 3-D, RealD 3D, IMAX 3D, and 4DX formats in the United States on March 4. Zootopia received positive reviews from critics, who praised its screenplay, animation, voice acting, subject matter, and Michael Giacchino's musical score. The film opened to record-breaking box offices in several countries, and earned a worldwide gross of over $1billion, making it the fourth-highest-grossing film of 2016. The film earned numerous accolades; it was named one of the top ten best films of 2016 by the American Film Institute, and received Best Animated Feature at the 89th Academy Awards, among numerous other accolades. A television spin-off series, Zootopia+, premiered on Disney+ on November 9, 2022. A sequel is in development.

Plot
In a world populated by anthropomorphic mammals, Judy Hopps, a rabbit from a rural town called Bunnyburrow, fulfils her childhood dream of becoming the first rabbit police officer in the urban city of Zootopia. Despite being the academy valedictorian, Judy is assigned to parking duty by Chief Bogo, who fails to recognize her talent. 

On her first day on the job, Judy is hustled by a con artist fox duo, Nick Wilde and Finnick. The next day, a small-time crook and bootleg film seller named Duke Weaselton steals a bag of crocus bulbs known as Midnicampum holicithias. Judy abandons her post to arrest Weaselton, and is reprimanded by Bogo. Mrs. Otterton unexpectedly barges into Bogo's office, pleading for someone to find her husband Emmitt, one of fourteen missing mammals. Judy volunteers and the city's assistant mayor, a sheep named Dawn Bellwether, praises the assignment. Bogo has no choice but to agree, but secretly orders Judy to resign if she fails after forty-eight hours.

Having ascertained that Nick was the last to see Emmitt, Judy forces him into helping her by covertly recording his confession to tax evasion on her carrot pen. They track Emmitt's belongings to a limousine owned by crime boss Mr. Big, an arctic shrew whom Nick has a history with. He reveals that Emmitt suddenly went "savage" and attacked Mr. Big's chauffeur Manchas, a black jaguar. 

Upon interrogation, Manchas explains that prior to attacking him, Emmitt yelled about "Night Howlers", before then turning savage himself and chasing the pair. Judy traps Manchas and calls the ZPD for help, but Manchas vanishes before they arrive. Bogo demands Judy's resignation, but Nick reminds Bogo that she still has ten hours remaining. While leaving the scene, Nick reveals to Judy that he became a con artist because, as a child, he tried to join the Junior Ranger Scouts, but was bullied and rejected simply for being a fox.

At City Hall, Bellwether offers Judy and Nick access to Zootopia's traffic cameras. They discover Manchas was taken by timberwolves, whom Judy surmises are the "Night Howlers". Following the wolves, the duo locates Emmitt, Manchas, and the other missing animals, who are now all "savage" predators, imprisoned at a local asylum. Zootopia's mayor, Leodore Lionheart, ordered their capture and is trying to ascertain the cause of their feral behavior. Lionheart and the asylum staff are soon arrested for false imprisonment, and Bellwether becomes the new mayor. 

Judy, praised for solving the case, asks Nick to join the ZPD as her partner. However, he angrily rejects her offer and abandons her after Judy claims that predatory biology is behind the mysterious "savageness" epidemic. Judy's comments, broadcast on television, incite fear and discrimination against predators throughout Zootopia.

Wracked with guilt, Judy quits her job and returns to Bunny Burrow to manage her parent's vegetable stand. There, she learns that "Night Howlers" are actually flowers with severe, lasting psychotropic effects that cause mammals to essentially return to a feral state. Realizing they are the reason predators are becoming savages, Judy returns to Zootopia and reconciles with Nick. Aided by Mr. Big, the pair interrogate Weaselton, who admits he was hired by a ram named Doug to steal the Night Howler bulbs. They find Doug in a laboratory hidden in the city subway, where he manufactures a Night Howler serum to be shot at predators via a dart pistol. Judy and Nick obtain a serum gun as evidence, but before they can reach the ZPD, Bellwether confronts them in the Natural History Museum, revealing herself to have masterminded a prey-supremacist conspiracy. The duo become trapped in an exhibit and Bellwether attempts to infect Nick by shooting him with the pistol before summoning the ZPD, but shockingly discovers that Nick had replaced the ammunition with blueberries. Judy reveals she recorded Bellwether's confession with the carrot pen, after which the ZPD arrives.

Bellwether and her accomplices are arrested. The still-imprisoned Lionheart publicly denies knowledge of her plot and claims that imprisoning the infected predators was a "wrong thing for the right reason". With the cause of the epidemic identified, the predators are cured and Judy is reinstated into the ZPD. Months later, Nick graduates from the police academy, becoming her partner and the first fox police officer.

Voice cast

 Ginnifer Goodwin as Judy Hopps, a young optimistic rabbit from Bunnyburrow and a newly appointed member of the Zootopia Police Department, assigned to the 1st Precinct.
 Della Saba voices a younger Judy Hopps.
 Jason Bateman as Nick Wilde, a sly red fox who is a small-time con artist.
 Kath Soucie voices a younger Nick Wilde.
 Idris Elba as Chief Bogo, an African buffalo who is the police chief of the Zootopia Police Department's 1st Precinct.
 Jenny Slate as Dawn Bellwether, a diminutive sheep who is the assistant mayor of Zootopia, and secretly the mastermind behind the conflict.
 Nate Torrence as Benjamin Clawhauser, an obese cheetah who works as a dispatcher and desk sergeant for the Zootopia Police Department's 1st Precinct.
 Bonnie Hunt as Bonnie Hopps, a European rabbit from Bunnyburrow who is Judy Hopps' mother.
 Don Lake as Stu Hopps, a European rabbit from Bunnyburrow who is Judy Hopps' father and a carrot farmer.
 Tommy Chong as Yax, a laid-back domestic yak who owns the naturist club Mystic Springs Oasis in Sahara Square.
 J. K. Simmons as Mayor Lionheart, a lion who is the noble, but pompous Mayor of Zootopia.
 Octavia Spencer as Mrs. Otterton, a concerned North American river otter whose husband Emmitt has gone missing.
 Alan Tudyk as Duke Weaselton, a small-time least weasel crook also known for selling bootleg DVDs. The name references the Duke of Weselton from Frozen, whom Tudyk also voices.
 Shakira as Gazelle, a Thomson's gazelle who is a famous pop star. Shakira also voices Gazelle in the Spain and Latin America Spanish dubs.
 Raymond S. Persi as Flash, the "fastest" three-toed sloth in the DMV (short for Department of Mammal Vehicles).
 Persi also voices Officer Higgins, a hippopotamus who is an elite member of the Zootopia Police Department's 1st Precinct.
 Maurice LaMarche as Mr. Big, an Arctic shrew who is the most fearsome crime boss in Tundratown and is served by a group of polar bears.
 Phil Johnston as Gideon Grey, a red fox from Bunnyburrow who used to bully the young rabbits and sheep when he was young. As an adult, he has reconciled with those he tormented and became a much-respected baker.
 Johnston also voices an angry offscreen character who states that his taxes pay Judy's salary after she gives him a parking ticket.
 Fuschia! as Major Friedkin, a polar bear who works at the Zootopia Police Academy as a drill instructor.
 John DiMaggio as Jerry Jumbeaux Jr., an ill-tempered African elephant who owns an ice cream parlor called Jumbeaux's Café, frequented by elephants and other larger mammals.
 DiMaggio also voices Woolter and Jesse (a pun on the show Breaking Bads main protagonists, Walter White and Jesse Pinkman), two tough rams who are Doug's assistants; a moose that gets a parking ticket from Judy; and a pig reporter.
 Katie Lowes as Dr. Madge Honey Badger, a honey badger scientist who helps Mayor Lionheart look for the cause of the animals' savagery.
 Gita Reddy as Nangi, an Indian elephant who works as a yoga instructor at Mystic Springs Oasis.
 Jesse Corti as Manchas, a black jaguar from Zootopia's Rainforest District who is a chauffeur for Zootopia's biggest limo company and is the personal chauffeur to Mr. Big.
 Tom Lister Jr. as Finnick, a fennec fox who is Nick's partner in crime.
 Josh Dallas as an unnamed frantic domestic pig who frantically asks Judy for help after his "Flora and Fauna" flower shop is robbed by Duke Weaselton. He later appears as a protester at Gazelle's peace rally arguing with a female leopard.
 Leah Latham as Fru Fru, an arctic shrew and Mr. Big's daughter who befriends Judy after Judy saves her from a runaway Donut sign in Little Rodentia. She also makes Judy the Godmother and namesake of her daughter.
 Rich Moore as Doug, an emotionless ram chemist and sniper who works for Bellwether.
 Moore also voices Larry, a gray wolf that is a security guard at Cliffside Asylum.
 Fabienne Rawley and Peter Mansbridge as Fabienne Growley and Peter Moosebridge, the snow leopard and moose anchors of the ZNN News.
 The moose co-anchor is used in the standard version of the film, released in the United States, Italy, France, Canada, Russia, Philippines, and Mexico. In the UK version, the moose is named as Moosos Alexander, voiced by radio journalist Vassos Alexander (though the UK home release used his US name and voice). In other countries, the anchor is a different animal voiced by a different person. David Campbell voices a koala newscaster named David Koalabell in the Australian and New Zealand versions. The Brazilian version uses a jaguar named Onçardo Boi Chá who is voiced by Ricardo Boechat. The Chinese version uses an unnamed giant panda.
 Byron Howard as Bucky Oryx-Antlerson, a greater kudu who is Judy Hopps' neighbor and Pronk's husband.
 Howard also voices Travis, Gideon Grey's black-footed ferret friend.
 Jared Bush as Pronk Oryx-Antlerson, a gemsbok who is Judy Hopps' neighbor and Bucky's husband.
 Mark Rhino Smith as Officer McHorn, a black rhinoceros police officer who is part of the Zootopia Police Department's 1st Precinct.
 Josie Trinidad as Mrs. Dharma Armadillo, a nine-banded armadillo and the landlady of the Grand Pangolin Apartments that Judy Hopps moves into.
 John Lavelle as the unnamed construction mouse foreman of Little Rodentia's construction crew who receives the Pawpsicle sticks from Nick and Finnick.
 Kristen Bell as Priscilla, a three-toed sloth and Flash's co-worker at the DMV.

Production

Writing
Development of the film that would come to be called Zootopia began when Byron Howard pitched six-story ideas to Disney Animation chief creative officer and executive producer John Lasseter, of which three involved animal characters: an all-animal adaptation of The Three Musketeers, a 1960s-themed story about a "mad doctor cat...who turned children into animals", and a "bounty hunter pug in space". The common thread running through these ideas was that Howard wanted to do a film similar to Disney's Robin Hood, which also featured animals in anthropomorphic roles. According to Howard, Zootopia emerged from his desire to create something different from other animal anthropomorphic films, where animals either live in the natural world or in the human world. His concept, in which animals live in a modern world designed by animals for animals, was well received by Lasseter, who responded by embracing and lifting Howard "in the air like a baby Simba". Lasseter suggested that Howard should try combining the 1960s theme with the animal characters, especially the space pug. This led Howard to develop and pitch Savage Seas, an international spy film centered on an arctic hare named "Jack Savage" who was somewhat like James Bond. It was around this time that screenwriter Jared Bush was hired to work on the film; he was excited to work on a spy film because his own father and grandfather had worked for the Central Intelligence Agency.

Howard and Bush continued to develop the film with the assistance of the Disney Story Trust, the studio's top creative personnel who meet regularly to review and discuss all projects in development. The most delightful part of the spy film turned out to be its first act, set in a city created by and for animals. To focus on the all-animal city, Howard eventually dropped the 1960s setting, along with the espionage and international aspects, and changed the film into a contemporary police procedural in which Nick Wilde was the lead role and Judy Hopps was essentially his sidekick. For a while, "the filmmakers were very committed" to that version of the story, but then in November 2014, the filmmakers realized the film's plot would be more engaging if they reversed the roles to instead focus on Hopps as opposed to Wilde. The change in perspective involved dropping several characters, including two characters known as "The Gerbil Jerks" who were described as "trust-fund gerbils that had nothing better to do than harass Nick."

Pre-production

In May 2013, The Hollywood Reporter initially reported that Howard was directing the film and that Jason Bateman had been cast, but little else about the film was known at the time. Zootopia was first officially announced on August 10, 2013, at the D23 Expo, with a March 2016 release date.

Research for the film took place in Disney's Animal Kingdom, as well as in Kenya and the San Diego Zoo Safari Park, where animators spent eight months studying various animals' walk cycles as well as fur color. Eight hundred thousand forms of mammals were created for and featured in the film. To make the characters' fur even more realistic, they also went to the Natural History Museum of Los Angeles County to closely observe the appearance of fur with a microscope under a variety of lighting. The filmmakers drew inspiration for Zootopias urban design from major cities including New York City, San Francisco, Las Vegas, Paris, Shanghai, Hong Kong, and Brasília. For assistance with designing motor vehicles appropriate for so many different types and sizes of mammals, the filmmakers consulted with J Mays, former chief creative officer of the Ford Motor Company. During the development process, Walt Disney Studios chairman Alan F. Horn suggested that Nick should expressly state his disappointment ("Just when I thought someone actually believed in me...") after discovering that Judy still fears him as a predator. In March 2015, it was revealed that Rich Moore (Wreck-It Ralph) had been added as a director of the film, in addition to Jared Bush (Penn Zero: Part-Time Hero) as co-director.

Animation
Disney's most recent work on animating fur was for the titular character of the 2008 film Bolt, but the software they had used at the time was not ready for creating the realistic fur of the animals of Zootopia. Therefore, the studio's IT engineers developed the fur-controlling software "iGroom", which gave character designers precise control over the brushing, shaping and shading of fur and made it possible to create a variety of eccentric character styles for each animal. The software was also able to control an unseen "imaginary" under-layer that gave fur a degree of plushness not seen before. This feature was used to create characters like Officer Clawhauser, who has a big head that is entirely made of spotted fur. Characters with noteworthy numbers of strands of hair or fur included both of the two lead characters, Judy Hopps and Nick Wilde, who each had around 2.5 million hairs; a giraffe with nine million strands of fur; a gerbil with 480,000 strands; and a rodent with more strands of hair than the 400,000 that were on Elsa's head in Frozen.

Zootopia was the second time Disney used the Hyperion renderer, which they had first used on Big Hero 6. A new fur paradigm was added to the renderer to facilitate the creation of realistic images of the animals' dense fur. Nitro, a real-time display application developed since the making of Wreck-It Ralph, was used to make the fur more consistent, intact and subtle much more quickly, as opposed to the previous practice of having to predict how the fur would work while making and looking at silhouettes or poses for the character. The tree-and-plant generator Bonsai, first used in Frozen, was used to make numerous variations of trees with very detailed foliage.

Zootopia was produced in makeshift quarters in a giant warehouse in North Hollywood (together with Moana) while Disney Animation's headquarters in Burbank was being renovated.

Casting
On May 6, 2015, Bateman and Ginnifer Goodwin were announced as having been cast, respectively, in the roles of Nick Wilde and Judy Hopps. The filmmakers chose Bateman because they wanted an actor who could bring "a funny yet heartfelt side" with "a wily, dry-witted sort of voice". Bateman described his character as "a crafty, sarcastic schemer", remarking on the role's similarity to many other roles he had done since he was 12. He explained that he had said to the directors: "'What kind of voice do you guys want me to do?' And they just looked at me like I was an idiot and said, 'Just do what you do. Just talk.'"

Commenting on the casting of Goodwin, Moore said that she brought "very centered sweetness, tremendous heart and a great sense of humor"; he described Judy as "a little Pollyanna mixed with Furiosa". Goodwin stated about her character: "People mistake kindness for naïveté or stupidity, and she is a good girl through and through. But she's not a dumb bunny."

Music

The film's score is composed by Michael Giacchino, in his first feature-length project for Walt Disney Animation Studios, as he previously worked on several short films and television specials produced by the company, as well as multiple Pixar films. Recording took place from November 16–20, 2015, with an 80-piece orchestra conducted by Tim Simonec. In addition to her voice role of Gazelle, pop star Shakira also contributed an original song to the film titled "Try Everything", which was written by Sia and Stargate. The soundtrack was released on March 4, 2016, by Walt Disney Records.

Marketing
The first teaser trailer was released online at Walt Disney Animation Studios' YouTube page on June 11, 2015. A second teaser trailer was released online again at Walt Disney Animation Studios' YouTube page on November 23, 2015, featuring a sequence of the film where the main characters encounter a Department of Mammal Vehicles (based on the DMV) run entirely by sloths. The official theatrical trailer for the film was released online at Walt Disney Animation Studios' YouTube page on New Year's Eve 2015. Figures of Judy Hopps and Nick Wilde were released for Disney Infinity 3.0 on March 1, 2016.

In addition, the studio devoted considerable marketing attention to the furry fandom demographic, believing that they would logically be most interested in this film project.

Release

Theatrical
Zootopia was released on March 4, 2016, in Disney Digital 3-D, RealD 3D, and IMAX 3D, making it the first Disney animated film shown in domestic IMAX theatres since Treasure Planet (2002). It was shown for the first time to the public as a feature film in an international competition for a young audience during the Brussels Animation Film Festival in Belgium on February 7, and was screened to the general media and audience on February 13.

In China, the state's SAPPRFT granted the film a rare two-week extension to play in theaters in addition to its limited 30-day run, which was to have ended on April 3.

Alternative titles
The film was retitled for theatrical release across several international territories. In the United Kingdom and other European, Middle Eastern, and North African countries, the film was renamed Zootropolis, a reference to the concept of a "metropolis" rather than to that of a "utopia". This was due to Disney being unable to trademark the name "Zootopia" in these territories for various legal reasons, including Danish Givskud Zoo registering the name Zootopia in 2014.<ref>{{cite news |title=Zootopia' to be called 'Zootropolis' in the UK (possibly because of an actual zoo)' |work=Eye on Animation |url=http://eye-on-animation.tumblr.com/post/113885292669/zootopia-to-be-called-zootropolis-in-the-uk |url-status=live |archive-url=https://web.archive.org/web/20160623162412/http://eye-on-animation.tumblr.com/post/113885292669/zootopia-to-be-called-zootropolis-in-the-uk |archive-date=June 23, 2016}}</ref> In Germany, the film was titled Zoomania due to a children's book by German author Kay Fischer titled Zootopolis released in 2010.

Home mediaZootopia was released by Walt Disney Studios Home Entertainment on Blu-ray, Blu-ray 3D, DVD, and Digital HD platforms on June 7, 2016. It includes some bonus material such as "Scoretopia", an alternate opening, and the music video to Shakira's "Try Everything". The film debuted at the top of the home media sales chart for the week ending on June 12, 2016. Zootopia was released on 4K Blu-ray on November 5, 2019.

Re-release
On June 22, 2020, amid the reopening of movie theaters due to the COVID-19 global pandemic, Disney announced that Zootopia, along with 11 other Disney owned movies, were to return to US theaters during a 4-week period. Zootopia returned to US theaters on June 26 and played through July 2, 2020, alongside The Avengers, and The Greatest Showman. The film grossed a total of  $393,600 and was the top film in theaters during its US re-release.

Weeks later, on July 20, 2020, it was announced that the film would be returning to theaters in China, along with Big Hero 6 and the Chinese debut of Sonic the Hedgehog on July 31, 2020.

Reception
Box officeZootopia grossed $341.3 million in the U.S. and Canada and $682.5 million in other countries for a worldwide total of $1.024 billion, against a budget of $150 million. On March 18, 2016, the film reached the $500 million mark, becoming the third consecutive Walt Disney Animation Studios film to reach the milestone after Frozen (2013) and Big Hero 6 (2014). On April 5, it became the first film of 2016 to gross over $800 million in ticket sales, and on April 24, became the first ever film of 2016 to cross $900 million. On June 5, the film crossed the $1 billion mark, becoming the second film of 2016 to do so (after the studio's own Captain America: Civil War), the fourth animated film (after Toy Story 3, Frozen and Minions), the eleventh Disney film, the third Disney animated film, and the twenty-sixth film overall to reach the milestone.

Worldwide, it was the fourth-highest-grossing film of 2016 (behind Civil War, Rogue One, and Finding Dory), the second-highest-grossing animated film of 2016, the second-highest-grossing Walt Disney Animation Studios film (second-highest overall) of all time in its original release (after Frozen), the second-highest-grossing original film (behind Avatar), and the fourth-highest-grossing animated film of all time. Deadline Hollywood calculated the net profit of the film to be $294.9 million, when factoring together all expenses and revenues for the film, making it the fifth-most profitable release of 2016.

United States and Canada
In the United States and Canada, pre-release tracking suggested the film would open to $60–70 million from 3,827 theaters in its opening weekend. It played in 3,100 3D theaters, 365 IMAX theaters, and 325 premium large format screens. It earned $1.7 million from Thursday previews, a record for a non-Pixar Disney animated film, for an animated film opening outside of summer, and seventh-biggest all time for an animated film. Buoyed by good word of mouth, it earned $19.5 million on its opening day, also a record for a non-Pixar Disney animated film (breaking Frozens record), and the second-biggest for a March animated film (behind Ice Age: The Meltdown). In its opening weekend, it scored a better than expected $75.1 million, which was the biggest non-Pixar Disney animated opening (breaking Big Hero 6s record), the biggest opening weekend among Walt Disney Animation Studios films (breaking Frozens record), the biggest March animated opening (breaking The Loraxs record), the seventh-biggest March opening, and the tenth-biggest animated opening of all time. Furthermore, its opening weekend is also the fourth-biggest for an original film, behind The Secret Life of Pets, Inside Out, and Avatar. It also performed exceptionally well in IMAX, where the film brought in $5.2 million from 366 screens, the second-best animated IMAX opening behind only Toy Story 3 ($8.4 million).

In its second weekend, it fell gradually by 31% to $51.3 million and recorded one of the best holds for an animated film, more or less on par with Wreck-It Ralphs second weekend drop of 32%, but a bigger drop than The Lego Movies 27%. It continued to top the box office for the third weekend, earning $37.2 million, falling by 28% from its previous weekend while passing the $200 million mark. This made it the second-biggest third weekend for a film that did not open at over $100 million, behind Avatar ($68 million) and ahead of Skyfall ($35 million). The film was overtaken by the superhero film Batman v Superman: Dawn of Justice in its fourth weekend, despite only a marginal decline. It spent a total of 13 consecutive weeks in the top ten, more than any other film except for Avatar (14 weeks) and Frozen (16 weeks) over the last decade.

It ended its theatrical run on August 4, 2016, after playing in theaters for a total of 154 days. It became the second-highest-grossing Walt Disney Animation Studios film (behind Frozen), the seventh-highest-grossing film of 2016, and the tenth-highest-grossing animated film of all time. In June 2020, due to the COVID-19 pandemic closing most theaters worldwide and limiting what films played, Zootopia returned to 280 theaters (mostly drive-ins) and grossed $393,600.

Other countriesZootopia received a scattered release as Walt Disney Studios Motion Pictures took advantage of school holidays in various markets. The film opened in a limited number of international markets in the weekend ending February 14, earning $4.5 million in three markets. It expanded to 22 markets in its second weekend, into 36% of its total international markets, and added $31.2 million. It added another $33 million in its third weekend with no new markets. In its fourth weekend, it expanded to 45 countries and grossed $64.7 million, coming in second place at the international box office, behind the Chinese film Ip Man 3. $3.3 million came from IMAX showings. It finally topped the box office in its fifth weekend after a strong second-weekend gross in China. It added $89.3 million from 45 countries, an increase of 25% from its previous weekend. It remained in first place for the second time in its sixth weekend, before Batman v Superman: Dawn of Justice took the top spot. It passed the $500 million mark in its eighth weekend.

In its opening weekend—which varied between markets—the film grossed $3.1 million in Spain and an additional $1.7 million in Belgium and Denmark. In Belgium, it had the biggest ever animated opening for a Disney or Pixar film. It broke opening records for a non-Pixar Disney animated film in China ($23.6 million), France ($8.1 million), Russia ($7.8 million), Germany ($6.6 million), Hong Kong ($1.5 million), Poland ($1.2 million), and India. It opened in the United Kingdom and Ireland with $7.5 million, Mexico with $4.6 million, Australia with $3.2 million, Brazil with $2.6 million, and in Italy, on a non-holiday weekend with $3.1 million. The film had number-one openings in Austria, Switzerland, Portugal, and South Africa. In the UK and Ireland, with significant competition from Batman v Superman: Dawn of Justice and the animated family film Kung Fu Panda 3, the film had a £5.31 million ($7.6 million) opening weekend from 579 theaters, including £1.74 million ($2.5 million) worth of previews, debuting in second place behind Dawn of Justice and falling just short of Walt Disney Animation Studios' best opening in the UK. It fell just 24% in its second weekend.Zootopias largest markets overseas are China ($235.6 million), followed by Japan ($70.1 million), Russia and the CIS ($39.2 million), Germany ($34.2 million), the UK ($34.2 million), France ($31.9 million), and South Korea ($31.6 million). In China, it is the highest-grossing Disney film in local currency (¥1.530 billion), surpassing Avengers: Age of Ultron (¥1.464 billion), as well as the seventh-highest-grossing film of all time. In Russia, it is the second-highest-grossing film of all time in local currency (₽2.3 billion), behind only Avatar (₽3.6 billion). It topped the Russian and German box office for three weekends, and the Chinese and Korean box office for two weekends.

In China, where it was locally known as Crazy Animal City (疯狂动物城), the film exceeded expectations and was considered Hollywood's biggest breakout success in China since 2015's Jurassic World made $229 million. It had an opening day of $3.4 million on its way to $23.6 million for its three-day opening weekend, debuting in second place and scoring the biggest non-sequel animated opening, as well as the second-biggest three-day opening and IMAX opening for an animated film, behind Kung Fu Panda 3. In its ninth day of release (a Saturday), it recorded the biggest single-day gross ever for an animated film, with $25 million (compared to $10.6 million on its first Saturday), and passed the lifetime total of Big Hero 6 to become the highest-grossing Disney animated film in China. In its second weekend, it grossed $60 million, an enormous increase of 139% from its previous weekend, and crossed the $100 million mark to become the third animated film in China to do so, after Kung Fu Panda 3 and Monkey King: Hero Is Back. This also marked the single best weekend for an animated film. In mid-March, the combined total of Kung Fu Panda 3 and Zootopia alone broke 2014's record of $286 million in box office grosses for American animated features in China. In its third weekend, it grossed $40 million for a total of $175 million, making it the highest-grossing animated film of all time in China. On March 27, its seventeenth day of release, it passed the $200 million mark, becoming the first animated film, the second Disney film, and the sixth Hollywood film overall to pass that milestone. It became the highest-grossing animated film of all time and the second-highest-grossing film of 2016, behind only The Mermaid.

It opened in Japan on April 23 and earned $4 million in its opening weekend, debuting at second place in the box office, behind Detective Conan: The Darkest Nightmare, and had the third-biggest Walt Disney Animation Studios debut in that market, behind Frozen and Big Hero 6. Deadline.com pointed out that the average opening number might have been due to the 2016 Kumamoto earthquakes, which could have affected moviegoers. In a rare achievement, it topped the box office in its third weekend after two weeks at No. 2. In the following two weekends, it continued to increase its ticket sales, and topped the box office there for four consecutive weekends. After four straight wins, it was finally overtaken by the R-rated superhero film Deadpool. It was the No. 1 western/Hollywood film for eight consecutive weekends. The Hollywood Reporter cited that strong word of mouth, audiences watching both the English and Japanese versions, and 3D and 4DX screenings, as well as a popular Japanese version of the "Try Everything" song by Dream Ami, all helped boost Zootopias performance. Its strong run in the market aided the film to propel past the $1 billion mark worldwide. It remained in top three for 11 consecutive weekends and has grossed a total of $70.1 million there.

Critical response
The website's critical consensus reads: "The brilliantly well-rounded Zootopia offers a thoughtful, inclusive message that's as rich and timely as its sumptuously state-of-the-art animationall while remaining fast and funny enough to keep younger viewers entertained." It was the site's second-highest-rated film of 2016 behind Moonlight. On Metacritic, the film has a score of 78 out of 100, based on 43 critics, indicating "generally favorable reviews". Audiences polled by CinemaScore gave the film an average grade of "A" on an A+ to F scale.

Neil Genzlinger of The New York Times considered the movie "funny, smart, [and] thought-provoking". Peter Travers of Rolling Stone wrote that Zootopia "may be the most subversive movie of" 2016, giving the film three-and-a-half stars out of four and praising its timely message about the harm of prejudice in the face of the prevailing xenophobic political rhetoric at the time of the film's release, and the film's humor. Peter Debruge at Variety opined that Zootopia "plays directly to the studio's strength". IGN reviewer Eric Goldman gave the film a 9.0 out of 10 'Amazing' score, saying "Zootopia is a wonderful example of how Disney, at its best, can mix its past and present together in a very cool, compelling way. It takes the classic animation trope of animals walking, talking and acting like humans, but gives it a modern spin both in terms of its humor and animation style ... and also in its themes, which are meaningful and fascinatingly topical."

Writing in British Sunday newspaper The Observer, reviewer Mark Kermode: 

In the UK daily newspaper The Daily Telegraph, Robbie Collin noted, "The lion doesn't just lie down with the lamb, they run for City Hall on a joint ticket. It's the diversity dream come true. Or is it? […] Think Busytown by way of Chinatown. It's almost certain to be the most existentially probing talking animal cartoon of the year." Collin added, "Like Nick Nolte and Eddie Murphy in 48 Hrs., albeit considerably cuter, Judy and Nick make a hilariously strained but effective double act – not least thanks to Goodwin and Bateman's tremendous vocal work, which trips along with the effortless swing and snap of great bebop."

Matt Zoller Seitz of RogerEbert.com, despite generally liking the film (three out of four stars), had trouble with the film's central metaphor that conflicted with its message: 

Also in The Daily Telegraph, Rosa Prince singled out the film's lead character, Judy Hopps, as a welcome change for Disney animated feature film heroines, such as the Disney Princess franchise. She found that unlike those characters' focus on romance or family loyalty, Hopps' focus is on her dream career as a police officer and serving her city.

Some were critically divided of the message about universal prejudices of all sorts interpreted as an allegory of American racism. Nico Lang of Consequence of Sound felt that Disney delivered a kids' version of Crash. Others criticized the use of prey and predator species in the "allegory" while critics at The Root stated positively that the movie acknowledges culpability of systemic racism and white supremacy.

Accolades

The film was chosen by the American Film Institute as one of the top ten films of 2016, and won the Academy Award, Golden Globe, Critics Choice Movie Award and Annie Award for Best Animated Feature Film. It also received a nomination for the BAFTA Award for Best Animated Film, which it lost to Kubo and the Two Strings.

Lawsuit
On March 21, 2017, a copyright infringement lawsuit was filed against Disney by Esplanade Productions, a company owned by Gary L. Goldman, the co-screenwriter of Total Recall. The lawsuit claims that Goldman (in 2000 and 2009) pitched a concept to Disney for a live-action film titled Looney, which was about a socially awkward animator who creates a self-inspired TV cartoon called Zootopia. Disney twice rejected the pitch, but Goldman accused the company of copying the name, themes, settings, and character tropes. Filed with the lawsuit was a graphic of early concept artwork of characters that are claimed to appear similar to major characters from the film, including Nick Wilde, Judy Hopps, Flash, and Chief Bogo. A Disney spokesperson described the lawsuit as being "ridden with patently false allegations". After months of back-and-forth deliberation between the two parties, U.S. District Judge Michael W. Fitzgerald dismissed the infringement claims on November 8, 2017. As stated in the final review, "Goldman's effort to make the plots of Looney and Zootopia seem similar were strained. All the purported similarities between the two works were themes, not plot points or sequences of events, that were too general to be protected by copyright law." Esplanade appealed to the Ninth Circuit, which affirmed the dismissal on April 24, 2019.

Merchandise
A card game based on the film called Zootopia: Suspect Search was released, as well as a game for mobile phones titled Zootopia Crime Files.

In May 2018, it was announced that a Zootopia graphic novel is set to be published by Dark Horse Comics. The graphic novel, titled Disney Zootopia: Friends to the Rescue, was written by Jimmy Gownley, with art by Leandro Ricardo da Silva. It was released on September 25, 2018.

Theme park attractions
On January 22, 2019, Disney Parks announced a themed area based on Zootopia was to be coming to Shanghai Disneyland Park, with construction on the land beginning on December 9, 2019. Construction halted for a brief period during the COVID-19 pandemic, but by June 2020, construction had resumed. It is set to open in 2023.

Television spin-off

On December 10, 2020 during the Disney Investors Day livestream, Walt Disney Animation Studios announced that a television series entitled Zootopia+ would premiere in 2022 on Disney+ as one of the studios' first television projects, as most TV shows based on Disney's animated films are produced by Disney Television Animation. It was announced to be an anthology series that would feature storylines that follow 3 sets of characters from the film (the mobster shrews, the tiger dancers, and the sloths).JUST ANNOUNCED: Disney Animation's first-ever original animated series on #DisneyPlus: Baymax!, Zootopia+, and Tiana are coming in 2022, and Moana, the series, in 2023. On November 12, 2021, Disney confirmed the series for a release in 2022, and also released a first-look teaser image which included characters from the film not previously confirmed to be in the series. The series would be directed by Trent Correy and Josie Trinidad. It was released on November 9, 2022 with six shorts.

Among the episodes include an action parody starring Bonnie and Stu Hopps, a musical starring Duke Weaselton, a Real Housewives spoof with Fru-Fru, a film noir parody with Mr. Big, a dance competition parody with Clawhauser, Bogo, and Gazelle, and a romantic comedy parody with Flash and Priscilla. Judy Hopps and Nick Wilde cameo in the action parody and make other appearances throughout. All the cast members from the movie reprised their roles. The music is composed by Curtis Strong and Mick Giacchino (Michael's son), with Michael scoring the "Duke the Musical" episode with lyrics by Kate Anderson and Elyssa Samsel (Olaf's Frozen Adventure, Central Park).

Sequel
In June 2016, Howard and Moore were in talks about the possibility of a Zootopia sequel. On February 8, 2023, Disney CEO Bob Iger announced that a sequel to Zootopia'' was in the works.

Notes

References

External links

 
 
 
 
 
 
 
 
 Official screenplay

2016 films
2016 3D films
2016 computer-animated films
2010s American animated films
American 3D films
American buddy cop films
Animated buddy films
Animated films about mammals
American animated feature films
Annie Award winners
Best Animated Feature Academy Award winners
Best Animated Feature Annie Award winners
Best Animated Feature Broadcast Film Critics Association Award winners
Best Animated Feature Film Golden Globe winners
2010s English-language films
Films adapted into television shows
Films directed by Byron Howard
Films directed by Rich Moore
Films produced by Clark Spencer
Films scored by Michael Giacchino
Films with screenplays by Jared Bush
Films with screenplays by Phil Johnston (filmmaker)
Films with screenplays by Jennifer Lee (filmmaker)
Films with screenplays by Jim Reardon
Films about prejudice
IMAX films
American police detective films
Walt Disney Animation Studios films
Walt Disney Pictures animated films
2010s buddy comedy films
2010s buddy cop films
3D animated films
Fictional places in Disney films
Zootopia (franchise)